The 1894 Texas gubernatorial election was held to elect the Governor of Texas. Attorney General Charles Culberson was elected Governor with a plurality of the vote over Populist candidate Thomas Nugent.

General election

Candidates
Charles Culberson, Attorney General of Texas (Democratic)
J.M. Dunn (Prohibition)
William K. Makemson, writer, historian, and candidate for Lieutenant Governor in 1892 (Republican)
Thomas Lewis Nugent, nominee for Governor in 1892 and former judge (Populist)
John B. Schmitz, undertaker and Republican nominee for Treasurer in 1890 (Lily White Republican)

Results

References

1894
Texas
1894 Texas elections